The La Bella Vita, also known as Huizhong Road Tower, is a residential skyscraper located in Taichung's 7th Redevelopment Zone, Xitun District, Taichung, Taiwan. It is designed by Antonio Citterio Patricia Viel and Partners.

Design
Designed by the Milan-based architectural firm Antonio Citterio Patricia Viel and Partners (ACPV), the building combines Italian elements with Taiwanese culture, generating a tower composed of seemingly disjoint, yet complementary volumes, which symbolise the unique rock formations found in Taiwan. The exterior façade of La Bella Vita consists of a honeycomb-style crystalline-structured window that allows natural light into the building. The tower offers 168 residential units overlooking the cityscape of the fast-emerging Taichung's 7th Redevelopment Zone.

See also 
 List of tallest buildings in Taiwan
 List of tallest buildings in Taichung
 Taichung's 7th Redevelopment Zone
 Antonio Citterio
 Treasure Garden

References

2020 establishments in Taiwan
Residential skyscrapers in Taiwan
Skyscrapers in Taichung
Taichung's 7th Redevelopment Zone
Apartment buildings in Taiwan
Residential buildings completed in 2020